Parygino is a rural locality (a selo) in Karalatsky Selsoviet, Kamyzyaksky District, Astrakhan Oblast, Russia. The population was 312 as of 2010. There are 4 streets.

Geography 
Parygino is located 34 km southeast of Kamyzyak (the district's administrative centre) by road. Karalat is the nearest rural locality.

References 

Rural localities in Kamyzyaksky District